Jan Christian Stewart (born October 17, 1965) is a former rugby union centre, who played internationally for Canada and the South Africa Springboks. Stewart earned 17 caps, 14 with Canada and three with South Africa.

Career
Stewart matriculated at Woodridge College in the Eastern Cape and in 1987 he enrolled at the University of Stellenbosch. In 1989 he joined Villagers, within the Western Province club system. At the end of his career with Western Province in 1998, he played 136 games for the province and scored 31 tries.

Having dual nationality, Stewart represented Canada in two rugby world cups in 1991 and in 1995 when he was not eligible for selection for the Springboks of South Africa. He played four world cup matches in 1991 and three in 1995.

In 1998 when Christian was finally available to represent the Springboks of South Africa he was selected and played 3 test matches. Unfortunately, in his 3rd and final test (the now famous test where South Africa needed to beat England at Twickenham to break the New Zealand All Blacks world record of 17 consecutive wins), he suffered a serious neck injury which ended his rugby playing career at the age of 33. After the 1995 Rugby World Cup, Christian Stewart was named in the all time Dream Team chosen by the rugby press.

Stewart also played for the Stormers in South Africa, Rovigo in Italy and rugby league for the Sydney Bulldogs in Australia.

Test history

Accolades
In 1988, Stewart was one of the five SA Young Players of the Year, along with Kobus Burger, Jacques du Plessis, Andre Joubert and JJ van der Walt.

See also
List of Canada national rugby union players – no. 205
List of South Africa national rugby union players – Springbok no. 642

References

1966 births
Living people
Canadian expatriates in South Africa
Canadian rugby union players
Canadian people of British descent
Canadian people of Afrikaner descent
Alumni of Diocesan College, Cape Town
Sportspeople from Toronto
Canadian people of South African descent
South African rugby union players
South Africa international rugby union players
South African people of Canadian descent
Canada international rugby union players
Western Province (rugby union) players
Stormers players
Villager FC players
Rugby union centres